Robert "Bob" Kelly (born 3 May 1955) is a Scottish curler and curling coach from Edinburgh.

He also participated as a member of Great Britain men's team at the 1992 Winter Olympics (where curling was a demonstration sport); the team finished in 5th place.

Teams

Men's

Mixed

Record as a coach of national teams

References

External links

1955 births
Living people
Scottish male curlers
British male curlers

Scottish curling champions
Olympic curlers of Great Britain
Curlers at the 1992 Winter Olympics
Scottish curling coaches
Curlers from Edinburgh